This page is a list of notable Dutch Jews, arranged by field of activity.

Economists

Historians

Jurists

Mathematicians

Musicians

Actors

Visual arts

Politicians

Business

Athletes

Writers

Other

Samuel Goudsmit (1902-1978), Dutch-American physicist

See also
History of the Jews in the Netherlands
List of Dutch Israelis
List of West European Jews

References

 
Netherlands
Jews
Netherlands
Jews,Netherlands